WONU (89.7 MHz) is a non-commercial FM radio station licensed to Kankakee, Illinois, United States, and serving the region south of the Chicago metropolitan area.  It is a non-profit, listener-supported station owned and operated by Olivet Nazarene University, which is located in Bourbonnais, Illinois.  It airs a Christian Contemporary Music radio format.

The studios and offices are located on the campus of Olivet Nazarene University, with the transmitter also on the campus off Elm Street.  WONU has sister stations in both Michigan and Indiana.  The station uses the moniker "Shine.FM."   WONU broadcasts in the HD Radio format.  It includes the regular Shine.FM broadcast, plus subchannels for Brilla.FM on HD2 and SparkHD.FM on HD3.

History
WONU began as a campus radio station, originally called "Olivet Radio."  It used a carrier current broadcasting system, heard on AM 640 but only in buildings on campus. The station came under the direction of Professor George Snyder. With a staff of only a handful of students, in the first semester on air, 1,000 hours of programming were produced.

Around 1951, WONC was discontinued until the 25th reunion of the ONU Class of 1941 raised the funds needed to bring radio broadcasting back to the ONU Campus. As part of this new venture, Olivet alumnus Dr. Ray Moore was brought in from Kansas City to oversee what would become Olivet Nazarene's first FM station, WKOC-FM, broadcasting on 88.3 MHz with a 10-watt mono signal.

In January 1967, WKOC-FM officially began broadcasting from studios located on the second floor of Ludwig Hall. Moore returned to Kansas City in 1968, leaving the station in the hands of broadcasting students such as Russ Bredholt. Around the spring of 1971, Moore came back to Olivet to resume as the Director of Broadcasting.

By the spring of 1977, from WKOC's inception in 1967, over 250 Federal Communications Commission (FCC) radio licenses had been granted to Olivet students who successfully completed testing.

In 1978, Professor Don Toland became Director of Broadcasting. Included in his tenure was a move from Ludwig Hall to the third floor of Benner Library. WKOC-FM increased to 420 watts in stereo.  The station later moved to 89.7 MHz and increased its power to 35,000 watts in stereo.

On-air fundraisers were started, known as "Share A Thons." They were designed to help Olivet Radio become more self-supporting, with reduced funding from the university. The broadcast day increased to 18 hours.  Remote broadcasts for Olivet college football and basketball games began. The station also affiliated with a national news network.

Dr. Henry Smith became the Director of Broadcasting during the Summer of 1988. He got the FCC to switch WKOC's call sign to WONU. He began a systemized music playlist and format for both the AM carrier current station and the FM station.

When Dr. Smith began work in the Graduate Studies Department at ONU, his former co-worker at Mt. Vernon Nazarene College's radio station, Professor Bill DeWees, was hired to lead WONU.

Professor Carl Fletcher and Professor Brian Utter switched the moniker from "Olivet Radio" to "Shine.FM."  New simulcast FM frequencies in Illinois, Michigan and Indiana were added.  Shine.FM also added online streaming formats of Spanish music and programming; praise and worship music; and Spark, a music format for young listeners.  In August 2010, a station on 89.3 in Morris, Illinois, WUON, was added to the network.

On December 28, 2010, WONU began a simulcast broadcast in Lowell, Indiana at 88.5 FM on WTMK-FM, purchased from the Calvary Radio Network.  WONU moved the 88.5 signal to Wanatah, on April 7, 2015.  WTMK can now be heard in Valparaiso, Indiana. In 2008, some listeners reported static in the signal, due to a new Chicago Public Radio station operating in Chesterton, Indiana on 89.5 under the call sign WBEW.

On July 28, 2011, WONU purchased WHZN at 88.3, New Whiteland, Indiana in the Indianapolis media market, from Horizon Christian Fellowship. A secondary studio is located at the First Church of the Nazarene on the east side of Indianapolis.

On December 1, 2014, WONU purchased translator W237BY at 95.3 FM in Mason, Michigan in the Lansing radio market from the Educational Media Foundation. The translator is fed locally from WITL HD-2 at 100.7. A power increase on the translator took place on May 13, 2015, increasing its coverage.

Concerts
WONU promotes and hosts Contemporary Christian concerts in the Kankakee area and on the Olivet Nazarene University campus.  In addition to Christian music, WONU also hosts Christian comedians.

Teaching
Because WONU is owned by Olivet Nazarene University, it is sometimes used as a teaching station.  The Bourbonnais studio contains a radio classroom with 20 computer stations for instruction in radio broadcasting.  Olivet's communication department employs a full-time radio professor to teach the classes.

Repeaters

Translators

References

External links
Official website
Olivet Nazarene University

ONU
Olivet Nazarene University
ONU
Radio stations established in 1967
1967 establishments in Illinois
ONU